Dom Feliciano is a municipality in the state of Rio Grande do Sul, Brazil. As of 2020, it had a population of 15,487 people, of whom 90% are of Polish descent.

See also
List of municipalities in Rio Grande do Sul

References

Municipalities in Rio Grande do Sul